Peter Ewen Solon (7 September 1917 – 7 July 1985) was a New Zealand-born actor, who worked extensively in both the United Kingdom and Australia.

At the outbreak of World War II, Solon became a member of the First Echelon, 2nd NZEF that saw service in the Middle East. Later appointed as a commissioned officer, he married Frances Gwendolyne Hughes, a New Zealander; also serving in Egypt during the War.

After training as a primary school teacher he travelled overseas to pursue an acting career. Film credits include: Rob Roy, the Highland Rogue, The Dam Busters, Murder Anonymous 1955 (part of the Scotland Yard film series), The Hound of the Baskervilles, The Terror of the Tongs, The Curse of the Werewolf, The Message, Unidentified Flying Oddball and The Wicked Lady.

On television, he was a series regular on Maigret; playing Sergeant Lucas, the eponymous commissaire's right-hand man, in 50 of the series' 52 episodes. His other appearances include: The Four Just Men, A Mask for Alexis,  Man of the World, Danger Man, Dixon of Dock Green, Doctor Who (in the serials The Savages and Planet of Evil), The Troubleshooters, Redcap, The Revenue Men, Bellbird, Virgin of the Secret Service, Journey to the Unknown, Matlock Police, Spyforce, Division 4 and Into the Labyrinth.

Solon married a second time in 1965, to an English actress, Vicki Woolf.

Selected filmography

 London Belongs to Me (1948) - Clerk (uncredited)
 The Naked Heart (1950)
 The Clouded Yellow (1950) - Coniston police sergeant (uncredited)
 Highly Dangerous (1950) - Enemy scientist (uncredited)
 The Rossiter Case (1951) - Inspector
 The Dark Man (1951) - Police driver
 Assassin for Hire (1951) - Fred
 Mystery Junction (1951) - Detective Sgt. Peterson
 Valley of Eagles (1951) - Det. Anderson
 The Card (1952) - Bookstall attendant at Llandudno (uncredited)
 The Story of Robin Hood and His Merrie Men (1952) - Merrie man
 Hunted (1952) - Radio operator
 Crow Hollow (1952) - Sgt. Jenkins
 Ghost Ship (1952) - Plain clothes man
 The Sword and the Rose (1953) - Guardsman
 Rob Roy, the Highland Rogue (1953) - Maj. Gen. Wightman
 The End of the Road (1954 film) (1954) - Policeman 
 As Long as They're Happy (1955) - Reporter (uncredited)
 The Dark Avenger (1955) - D'Estell
 The Dam Busters (1955) - Flight Sergeant G. E. Powell
 Lost (1956) - Bus inspector (uncredited)
 Jumping for Joy (1956) - Haines
 1984 (1956) - Outer Party orator
 Who Done It? (1956) - Police radio announcer (uncredited)
 Behind the Headlines (1956) - Superintendent Faro
 There's Always a Thursday (1957) - Inspector Bradley
 Yangtse Incident: The Story of H.M.S. Amethyst  (1957) - ERA Williams RN
 Account Rendered (1957) - Detective Inspector Marshall
 The Story of Esther Costello (1957) - Christine Brown's father (uncredited)
 The Long Haul (1957) - Minor role
 Robbery Under Arms (1957) - Sergeant Arthur
 The Mark of the Hawk (1957) - Inspector
 The Devil's Pass (1957) - Job Jolly
 The Silent Enemy (1958) - Willowdale captain
 The Big Money (1958) - Detective in Pub (uncredited)
 The Hound of the Baskervilles (1959) - Stapleton
 Jack the Ripper (1959) - Sir David Rogers
 The Stranglers of Bombay (1959) - Camel vendor (uncredited)
 Tarzan the Magnificent (1960) - Dexter
 The Sundowners (1960) - Halstead
 The Terror of the Tongs (1961) - Tang How - Tong leader's aide
 The Curse of the Werewolf (1961) - Don Fernando
 Mystery Submarine (1963) - Lt. Cmdr. Kirklees
 The Sandwich Man (1966) - Blind man
 Infamous Conduct (1966) - Dixon
 The Message (1977) - Yasser
 Unidentified Flying Oddball (1979) - Watkins
 A Nightingale Sang in Berkeley Square (1979) - Commander Ford
 Lion of the Desert (1980)
 The Wicked Lady (1983) - Clergyman at Tyburn
 Nutcracker (1983) - Monsieur Demaurault (final film role)

References

External links
 

1917 births
1985 deaths
New Zealand male film actors
New Zealand male television actors
20th-century New Zealand male actors
New Zealand emigrants to the United Kingdom
New Zealand expatriates in Australia